This is a list of players, past and present, who have been capped by their country in international football whilst playing for Mouloudia Club d'Alger.

Players

Algerien players

Foreign players

Players in international competitions

African Cup Players
  
 
 
1980 African Cup
  Lakhdar Belloumi
  Bouzid Mahyouz

1982 African Cup
  Ali Bencheikh

1984 African Cup
  Nasser Bouiche

1986 African Cup
  Nasser Bouiche

1988 African Cup
  Kamel Kadri
  Chaabane Merzekane
  Kamel Djahmoune
  Abdelouahab Maïche
  Said Meghichi

1990 African Cup
  Kamel Kadri
  Tarek Lazizi

1992 African Cup
  Kamel Kadri

1996 African Cup
  Tarek Lazizi

1998 African Cup
  Aomar Hamened

2000 African Cup
  Yacine Slatni
  Aomar Hamened

2002 African Cup
  Yacine Slatni

2010 African Cup
  Réda Babouche
  Lamine Zemmamouche

World Cup Players

 
World Cup 1982
  Ali Bencheikh

Olympic Players

 
1980 Summer Olympics
  Bouzid Mahyouz
  Lakhdar Belloumi

 
2016 Summer Olympics
  Abdelghani Demmou

External links
DzFoot
web.archive.org
National Football Teams

References

MC Alger
 
MC Alger international
Association football player non-biographical articles
MC Alger